Therese Lundin (born March 3, 1979) is a Swedish former football forward who played for Malmö FF and the Swedish national team. She is nicknamed Ludde.

Lundin retired in 2008 after suffering persistent knee injuries. She made a brief comeback in 2009 with Chicago Red Eleven.

References

External links
 National Team Profile

1979 births
Living people
FC Rosengård players
Damallsvenskan players
Swedish women's footballers
Sweden women's international footballers
Expatriate women's soccer players in the United States
Women's association football forwards
2007 FIFA Women's World Cup players
1999 FIFA Women's World Cup players
People from Karlskrona
Sportspeople from Blekinge County